Neville Lederle (25 September 1938 – 17 May 2019) was a racing driver from South Africa.  He participated in two World Championship Formula One Grands Prix, scoring a single championship point.

Early life
Lederle was born in Theunissen, Orange Free State and schooled at St Andrews in Bloemfontein.

Formula One career
Starting out in Formula One with his Ford-engined Lotus 18 in 1961, he retired from the Rand Grand Prix and only managed 14th in the Cape Grand Prix in January 1962. Later that year, however, he acquired a Lotus 21 with a Climax engine and came fifth in the 1962 Rand Grand Prix and fourth in the Natal Grand Prix. This form led him to a sixth place in the World Championship South African Grand Prix and thus a World Championship point in his first event at that level.

In 1963 Lederle broke a leg in practice for the Rand 9 Hours sports car race and missed a large part of the 1964 season whilst recovering. He returned with his Lotus 21 for the end-of-season 1964 Rand Grand Prix where he finished 10th, but he narrowly failed to qualify for January's 1965 South African Grand Prix. After this disappointment, Lederle effectively retired from racing to concentrate on business interests, which included a Volkswagen dealership.

Death
Lederle died at his home in Knysna on 17 May 2019.

Complete Formula One World Championship results
(key)

Non-Championship
(key)

References

 "The Grand Prix Who's Who", Steve Small, 1995.
 "The Formula One Record Book", John Thompson, 1974.

External links
F1 Rejects interview

1938 births
2019 deaths
People from Masilonyana Local Municipality
South African racing drivers
South African Formula One drivers
White South African people
Scuderia Scribante Formula One drivers